OpenPsych is an online collection of three open access journals covering behavioral genetics, psychology, and quantitative research in sociology. Many articles on OpenPsych promote scientific racism, and the site has been described as a "pseudoscience factory-farm". The journals were started in 2014 by Emil Kirkegaard, an activist with ties to the far-right, and Davide Piffer, an Italian parapsychologist, who had difficulty publishing their research in mainstream peer-reviewed scientific journals. The website describes them as open peer reviewed journals, but the qualifications and neutrality of the reviewers have been disputed.

Journal contents and quality
OpenPsych consists of three journals — Open Differential Psychology, Open Behavioral Genetics, and Open Quantitative Sociology & Political Science — founded by Emil Kirkegaard and Davide Piffer in 2014. Journal contents are free to access and there is no cost associated with submission. The founders of the website believed that their articles were being regularly rejected by mainstream scientific publishers because of bias against their contentious submissions. Many of the articles are about race realism, a form of scientific racism, and purport a biological basis for differences between races, ethnicities, and immigrant groups in measures such as crime and IQ. Unlike typical scientific journals, OpenPsych accepts anonymous manuscripts.

The quality of peer review at OpenPsych has been disputed. Reviewers do not need advanced academic qualifications, nor need to specialise in what they review. For example, Kirkegaard reviews paper submissions to two of the journals, but has only a BA in linguistics, claiming he is entirely "self-taught". Most of the reviewers are also authors of articles in the same group of journals. Of the thirteen known members of the review board in 2020, two were anonymous and eight seemed to have doctorates. Members of the review teams include Gerhard Meisenberg, Heiner Rindermann, Peter Frost, John Fuerst, Kenya Kura, Bryan J. Pesta, Noah Carl and Meng Hu.

The journals act as a research network for far right, alt-right, and White nationalist causes, following in the footsteps of the Pioneer Fund and Mankind Quarterly; of its top 15 contributors in 2018, 11 had written for Mankind Quarterly in the preceding three years. Several members of its editorial board hold far-right political views and have attended the controversial London Conference on Intelligence. The Southern Poverty Law Center, in an article discussing proponents of scientific racism including Kirkegaard, describes OpenPsych as a "pseudojournal". Kirkegaard is regarded by the Centre for Analysis of the Radical Right to be a "figure on the radical right fringe".
Landis MacKellar has described Emil Kirkegaard and John Fuerst as "both outright cranks" noting OpenPsych are "tenderly peer-reviewed online journals specializing in scientifically controversial (bordering on dubious) politically incorrect pieces derived in part from (Roger) Pearsonian hereditarianism."

Eric Turkheimer in a coauthored paper in Perspectives on Psychological Science criticises the review process of OpenPsych's journals and describes them as "pseudo-scientific vehicles for scientific racism":

Controversies

OKCupid
In May 2016, Kirkegaard and Julius Daugbjerg Bjerrekær published a paper in Open Differential Psychology that includes the data of nearly 70,000 OkCupid (a dating website) users, such as their intimate sexual details. The publication was widely criticised at the time and been described as "without a doubt one of the most grossly unprofessional, unethical and reprehensible data releases." Although Kirkegaard claims the data is public, this is disputed by others who point out the data is restricted to logged-in users only:

Kirkegaard uploaded the OkCupid data to the Open Science Framework, but this was later removed after OkCupid filed a Digital Millennium Copyright Act (DMCA) complaint.

Noah Carl
In April 2019, Noah Carl who reviews submissions for Open Quantitative Sociology & Political Science was dismissed as a research fellow at St Edmund's College, Cambridge University because of his association with OpenPsych, which involved collaborating with a number of individuals who are known to hold racist and far-right political views.

References

External links

Open access publishers
Academic publishing companies
2014 establishments in Denmark
Publishing companies established in 2014